William Romaine (1714 at Hartlepool – 1795), evangelical divine of the Church of England, was author of works once highly thought of by the evangelicals, the trilogy The Life, the Walk, and the Triumph of Faith.

Early life
Romaine was born at Hartlepool, County Durham, on 25 September 1714 the son of a corn merchant of French Protestant descent. He was educated at Houghton-le-Spring Royal Kepier Grammar School and Christ Church, Oxford.

Ministry
Romaine was ordained as a deacon in 1736,  and became curate of Loe Trenchard in Devon. He was ordained as a priest  in December 1738, following which he became curate of Banstead in Surrey and Horton in Middlesex,  holding both posts concurrently.

In 1739 he became engaged in a bitter controversy over the views of William Warburton. In 1741 he was appointed chaplain to the Lord Mayor of London, Daniel Lambert, who had his country house at Banstead, a post which gave him  the opportunity to preach in St Paul's Cathedral. In 1748 he became a lecturer at St George Botolph Lane in the City of London,  and the next year was appointed, in addition, to two lectureships at St Dunstan-in-the-West in Fleet Street.

It was in about 1748 he underwent an evangelical conversion. He used his positions as lecturer to preach evangelical doctrine to large crowds despite the opposition of the church hierarchy. In 1750 was afforded a further opportunity to evangelise when he was appointed assistant morning preacher at the fashionable church of St George's, Hanover Square in the West End of London. In 1751 he also accepted for a short time the professorship of Gresham Professor of Astronomy at Gresham College, His biographer William Bromley Cadogan wrote  that in this role, Romaine "attempted to prove, that God was best acquainted with his own works, and had given the best account of them in his own words".

From 1756, while retaining his position at St Dunstan's,  Romaine was a curate and morning preacher at  St Olave's in Southwark. He also acted as a travelling preacher, going   as far afield as Yorkshire and the West Country, and served as one of the Countess of Huntingdon's chaplains. In 1766, following a long dispute over his election, he  became  Rector of St Andrew by the Wardrobe.

Romaine was a notable Hebrew scholar, and published a four volume revision of Mario di Calasio's Hebrew dictionary and concordance between 1747 and 1749.

He died on 26 July 1795 and was buried in the church of St Andrew-by-the-Wardrobe.

Works 
Treatises Upon the Life, Walk and Triumph of Faith
The Self-existence of Jesus Christ
 Living by Faith in Christ
 The Gospel
 The Legal Spirit slain
 At War and Yet At Peace
  Thy Walk with God
Prayer
 Walk in Obedience to God
 Essay on Psalmody (1775)

See also
 Gresham Professor of Astronomy

References

Sources

External links
 Letters from the Late Rev. William Romaine, to a Friend, on the Most Important Subjects, During a Correspondence of Twenty Years
 Treatises Upon the Life, Walk and Triumph of Faith
 The Self-existence of Jesus Christ
 Images of Romaine at the National Portrait Gallery 

1714 births
1795 deaths
People from Hartlepool
People educated at Kepier School
18th-century Anglican theologians
18th-century English Anglican priests
Evangelical Anglicans
Evangelical Anglicanism
Evangelical Anglican theologians
Evangelical Anglican clergy
Evangelical Anglican biblical scholars
Gresham College